Senecio patagonicus is an arid land perennial Senecio native to high elevation steppe ecosystems of Patagonia in Argentina and Chile.

References

patagonicus